Greg Allen may refer to:

 Greg Allen (rugby league) (1947–2009), Australian rugby league footballer who played in the 1970s
 Greg Allen (baseball) (born 1993), American Major League Baseball outfielder
 Greg Allen (American football) (born 1963)
 Greg Allen (footballer) (born 1967), English midfielder footballer